Burlington Heights is an unincorporated community located within Freehold Township in Monmouth County, New Jersey, United States. The community was created in the early 1960s and originally consisted of 112 homes of mixed styles designed by Peter Petillo and Associates of Freehold. It is located along Colts Neck Road (County Route 537) on the east side of the township, near New Jersey Route 18 and the Colts Neck municipal line.

References

Neighborhoods in Freehold Township, New Jersey
Unincorporated communities in Monmouth County, New Jersey
Unincorporated communities in New Jersey